Ernesto Seikō Arakaki Arakaki (born June 13, 1979 in Lima) is a Peruvian retired football defender.

Club career
He had played for the Second Division team Deportivo AELU since he was twelve years old. In 1998, he was bought by the First Division team Municipal and played for them for two years. Alianza Lima bought him in 2000, where he scored his first goal. He has won four league-titles with Alianza and has been present in several international competitions. In 2008, he moved to Andean club Cienciano from the city of Cuzco.

He retired in 2010 due to a chronic knee injury that aggravated when he had a tried out in Asia. Now he is the coach of the divisiones inferiores of Alianza Lima.

External links 

Ernesto Arakaki at Delgol.com

1979 births
Living people
Footballers from Lima
Peruvian people of Japanese descent
Peruvian footballers
Peru international footballers
Deportivo Municipal footballers
Club Alianza Lima footballers
Cienciano footballers
Association football defenders